Sir Bernard Mallet,  (17 September 1859 – 28 October 1932) was a British civil servant. He served in three departments: the Treasury 1886–1897, Inland Revenue 1897–1907 and General Register Office from 1907.

He was the son of Sir Louis Mallet. He was educated at Clifton College and Balliol College, Oxford.  He became private secretary to Arthur Balfour. Later, he was Registrar General and President of the Royal Statistical Society from 1916 to 1918. Mallet was prominent in the Eugenics Society and presided over the World Population Conference, held in Geneva in 1927.

He married Marie Adeane, who at various times was a Maid of Honour to Queen Victoria and had two sons, one of whom was Sir Victor Mallet, the diplomat.

References

1859 births
1932 deaths
People educated at Clifton College
Knights Commander of the Order of the Bath
Presidents of the Royal Statistical Society
Registrars-General for England and Wales